"Penda's Fen" is the 16th episode of fourth season of the British BBC anthology TV series Play for Today. The episode was a television play that was originally broadcast on 21 March 1974. "Penda's Fen" was written by David Rudkin, directed by Alan Clarke, produced by David Rose, and starred Spencer Banks.

Plot 
Set in the village of Pinvin, near Pershore in Worcestershire, England, against the backdrop of the Malvern Hills, the play is an evocation of conflicting forces within England past and present. These include authority, tradition, hypocrisy, landscape, art, sexuality, and most of all, its mystical, ancient pagan past. All of this comes together in the growing pains of the adolescent Stephen, a vicar's son, whose encounters include angels, Edward Elgar and King Penda himself. The final scene of the play, where the protagonist has an apparitional experience of King Penda and the "mother and father of England", is set on the Malvern Hills.

Cast 
 Spencer Banks as Stephen
 Jennie Hesselwood
 Ian Hogg
 Georgine Anderson 
 John Atkinson
 Geoffrey Staines as King Penda

Music
Music from Elgar's The Dream of Gerontius features throughout the play. The 1971 Decca recording by Benjamin Britten with Yvonne Minton as the Angel is used, and the album itself features as a prop. Extracts from Elgar's Introduction and Allegro are also heard.

Original music is by Paddy Kingsland of the BBC Radiophonic Workshop, who also electronically manipulated parts of the Britten recording.

Reception
Critics have noted that the play stands apart from Clarke's other, more realist output. Clarke himself admitted that he did not fully understand what the story was about. Nonetheless it has gone on to acquire the status of minor classic, to win awards and to be rebroadcast several times by the BBC.

Following the original broadcast, Leonard Buckley wrote in The Times: "Make no mistake. We had a major work of television last night. Rudkin gave us something that had beauty, imagination and depth."

In 2006, Vertigo magazine described "Penda's Fen" as "One of the great visionary works of English film".

In 2011, "Penda's Fen" was chosen by Time Out London magazine as one of the 100 best British films. It described the play as a "multi-layered reading of contemporary society and its personal, social, sexual, psychic and metaphysical fault lines. Fusing Elgar's ‘Dream of Gerontius’ with a heightened socialism of vibrantly localist empathy, and pagan belief systems with pre-Norman histories and a seriously committed – and prescient – ecological awareness, ‘Penda's Fen’ is a unique and important statement."

The play was released on limited-edition Blu-ray and DVD in May 2016. In an essay published with the release, Sukhdev Sandhu argues that "Penda's Fen" "is, long before the term was first used to describe the work of directors such as Todd Haynes and Isaac Julien, a queer film". According to Sandhu, the play presents Stephen's discovery of his homosexuality as "a gateway drug to a new enlightenment" that "inspires heterodoxy".

See also
 Manichaeism

References

Bibliography

External links
 
 Synopsis at BFI screenonline
 Review at TV Cream
 Interview with David Rose and Peter Ansorge

1974 British television episodes
1974 television plays
BBC television dramas
British television plays
British supernatural television shows
Play for Today
Worcestershire in fiction